The Union of Rationalist Atheists and Agnostics (Unione degli Atei e degli Agnostici Razionalisti, UAAR) is the only nationwide association of atheists and agnostics in Italy. It is completely independent from political parties or lobbies of any kind. It numbers around 3,000 members.

UAAR was founded in 1991 to promote the diffusion of atheist and agnostic ideas, operate for a thoroughly secular state, and struggle against any privilege granted to the Roman Catholic religion and against any discrimination of nonbelievers.

UAAR's activities include the following:

 Between December 1996 and July 2019, UAAR has regularly published a bi-monthly magazine, L'Ateo (The Atheist); in January 2020 it started publishing a new bi-monthly magazine, Nessun Dogma.
 Besides seeking contacts with government representatives, UAAR is prepared to initiate legal actions to obtain the full acknowledgement for atheism and atheists' rights; they have, for instance, obtained recognition of the right for those baptised as infants to be considered no longer Catholic if they wish.
 Through its membership of the Humanists International (HI) and European Humanist Federation (EHF), UAAR collaborates with other humanist organisations on international issues; its logo references the Happy Human symbol, in common with other humanist organisations.

Among UAAR's main goals is the abrogation of article 7 of the Italian Constitution, which recognises the Lateran Treaties between Italy and Vatican City.

The Atheist Bus Campaign 

In January 2009, the organisation promoted an atheist bus campaign inspired by the similar initiative of the British Humanist Association. The campaign, due to start on 4 February 2009, was symbolically launched in Genoa, on the occasion of the nomination of the city's archbishop, Cardinal Angelo Bagnasco, as president of the Italian Episcopal Conference (CEI).

The original slogan chosen for the Italian campaign reads: "The bad news is that God does not exist. The good news is that you don't need it". On 16 January 2009 IGPDecaux, the company holding licenses for ads on public transport in Genoa, refused to give authorization to the atheist bus campaign on the grounds that it may "offend the moral, civic and religious convictions of the public". Antonio Catricalà, the then head of the Italian National Authority for Fair Trading and Competition, announced that the Authority filed a case against the Atheist Bus initiative because of the potentially "dangerous and mendacious nature" of the ads. As a reaction, the UAAR launched a new campaign in Genoa with a different slogan to comply with the advertising authority's rules: "The good news is that there are millions of atheists in Italy. The excellent news is they believe in freedom of speech".

References

External links

Atheism in Italy
Irreligion in Italy
Atheist organizations
Organizations established in 1991
Skeptic organisations in Italy
1991 establishments in Italy